This is a list of Marvel Universe fictional characters which were created for and are owned by Marvel Comics. Licensed or creator-owned characters (G.I. Joe, Godzilla, Groo the Wanderer, Men in Black, Conan the Barbarian,  Mighty Morphin Power Rangers, RoboCop, Star Trek, Rocko's Modern Life, The Ren and Stimpy Show, etc.) are not included.

Marvel-Electronic Arts video game characters are also included with references. Characters from the Marvel Comics/DC Comics intercompany crossover series of one-shots and Amalgam Comics, created and published by Marvel Comics, are included with reference.

List
 List of Marvel Comics characters: 0-9
 List of Marvel Comics characters: A
 List of Marvel Comics characters: B
 List of Marvel Comics characters: C
 List of Marvel Comics characters: D
 List of Marvel Comics characters: E
 List of Marvel Comics characters: F
 List of Marvel Comics characters: G
 List of Marvel Comics characters: H
 List of Marvel Comics characters: I
 List of Marvel Comics characters: J
 List of Marvel Comics characters: K
 List of Marvel Comics characters: L
 List of Marvel Comics characters: M
 List of Marvel Comics characters: N
 List of Marvel Comics characters: O
 List of Marvel Comics characters: P
 List of Marvel Comics characters: Q
 List of Marvel Comics characters: R
 List of Marvel Comics characters: S
 List of Marvel Comics characters: T
 List of Marvel Comics characters: U
 List of Marvel Comics characters: V
 List of Marvel Comics characters: W
 List of Marvel Comics characters: X
 List of Marvel Comics characters: Y
 List of Marvel Comics characters: Z

Other character lists
 List of alien races in Marvel Comics
 List of hidden races in Marvel Comics
 List of Marvel Comics teams and organizations
 List of criminal organizations in Marvel Comics
 List of S.H.I.E.L.D. members
List of Inhumans
 List of cosmic entities in Marvel Comics
 List of first appearances in Marvel Comics publications
 List of Marvel Comics Golden Age characters
 List of Ultimate Marvel characters

See also
Battle dice
Essential Marvel Comics
Marvel Universe Cards
Official Handbook of the Marvel Universe

External links

Marvel.com official site
MarvelApp.com

 
Characters